Seyyedabad (also Romanized as Seyyedābād; also known as Tūl Mūshkā Rūd) is a village in Charam Rural District, in the Central District of Charam County, Kohgiluyeh and Boyer-Ahmad Province, Iran. At the 2006 census, its population was 181, in 35 families.

References 

Populated places in Charam County